The Clan Mackinnon was a  cargo ship that was built in 1945 as Empire Dunnet by William Gray & Co Ltd, West Hartlepool, Co Durham United Kingdom for the Ministry of War Transport (MoWT). She was sold into merchant service in  1946 and renamed  Clan Mackinnon. In 1961 she was sold to a Hong Kong company and renamed Ardross. A sale to a Panamanian owner in 1963 saw her renamed Labuan Bay. She served until 1967, when she was wrecked off Borneo.

Description
The ship was built in 1945 by William Gray & Co Ltd, West Hartlepool, Co Durham. She was yard number 1177.

Her DWT was 10,100.

The ship was propelled by a  triple expansion steam engine.

History
Empire Dunnet was launched on 10 July 1945 and  completed in September. The United Kingdom Official Number 180086 was allocated. She was placed under the management of Common Bros Ltd, Newcastle upon Tyne.

In 1946, Empire Dunnet was sold to Clan Line Steamers Ltd and was renamed Clan Mackinnon, the third Clan Line ship to bear this name. In 1955, Clan Line was transferred to the Houston Line. In 1961, Clan Mackinnon was sold to Mullion & Co Ltd, Hong Kong, and was renamed Ardross. In 1963, she was sold to Kinabatangan Shipping SA, of Panama, and was renamed Labuan Bay.

On 20 March 1967, Labuan Bay ran aground at Bancoran Island, Borneo and caught fire. She was refloated four days later and towed to Manila, Philippines. On 11 July, a further fire occurred. Labuan Bay was scrapped in November 1967 at Kaohsiung, Taiwan.

References

External links
Photo of Clan Mackinnon

1945 ships
Ships built on the River Tees
Empire ships
Ministry of War Transport ships
Steamships of the United Kingdom
Merchant ships of the United Kingdom
Steamships of Hong Kong
Merchant ships of Hong Kong
Steamships of Panama
Merchant ships of Panama
Maritime incidents in 1967
Shipwrecks in the South China Sea